Rock Flat Creek is a watercourse that is part of the Murrumbidgee catchment within the Murray–Darling basin. It is located in the Monaro region of New South Wales, Australia.

Course and features 
The Rock Flat Creek (technically a river) rises below One Tree Hill, on the lower slopes of the Snowy Mountains, part of the Great Dividing Range. The creek descends  over its  course.

The Monaro Highway crosses the creek near the locality of Milton Park.

Mineral spring 
Near the Monaro Highway crossing, there is a mineral spring that comes to the surface, on the bank of Rock Flat Creek, about 16 km south-east of  Cooma. The spring water issues from near the base of a small rocky mount composed of highly inclined beds of quartzite and the surface of the flat in the vicinity of the spring is tufaceous limestone that has been deposited there by the spring water. The flow rate of the spring is about 245-litres per hour. The spring water has a pleasant taste and is carbonated.

An analysis of the spring water, c.1900, in units of grains per imperial gallon, revealed its mineral content as follows

See also 

 List of rivers of New South Wales (L-Z)
 Rivers of New South Wales
 Rock Flat, New South Wales (concerning the history of the spring)

References

External links

Murrumbidgee Catchment Management Authority website
 

Rivers of New South Wales
Tributaries of the Murrumbidgee River
Snowy Mountains
Snowy Monaro Regional Council
Springs of Australia